Sinali Alima Outtara (born 1 February 1988) is an Ivorian pole vaulter, who is the national record holder in indoor and outdoor pole vault events. She won a bronze medal at the 2010 African Championships in Athletics, a silver medal at the 2011 All-Africa Games, and a bronze medal at the 2015 African Games.

Personal life
As of 2011, Ouattara lived in Paris, France.

Career
In 2008, Ouattra came joint sixth in the junior pole vault event at the French national championships. In 2010, she came third in  the pole vault event at the 2010 African Championships in Athletics, after clearing a height of 3.40 metres. She came second in the pole vault event at the 2011 All-Africa Games. Ouattra cleared a height of 3.20 metres, and was one of only two people with a successful attempt in the event. She was the country's first medallist at the Games. In the same year, Ouattara set an Ivorian national record for indoor pole vault, by clearing a height of 3.65 metres at an event in Aulnay-sous-Bois, France.

In 2014, Ouattra set an outdoor national record of 3.80 metres at an event in Aulnay-sous-Bois, France. She came third at the 2015 African Games, clearing a height of 3.40 metres. In 2016, Ouattra came fourth in the pole vault event at the 2016 African Championships in Athletics. Ouattra competed at the 2017 Jeux de la Francophonie; she was one of eight Ivorian women at the Games.

References

External links
 World Athletics

1988 births
Living people
Ivorian pole vaulters
Ivorian expatriate sportspeople in France
Athletes (track and field) at the 2011 All-Africa Games
African Games medalists in athletics (track and field)
African Games silver medalists for Ivory Coast
Female pole vaulters
Athletes (track and field) at the 2015 African Games